Ali Salmani (born May 10, 1979) is an Iranian footballer.

Club career

Club Career Statistics
Last Update  19 October 2010 

 Assist Goals

External links
Profile at Iranproleague.net

Iranian footballers
Persepolis F.C. players
Steel Azin F.C. players
Paykan F.C. players
Pegah Gilan players
Saba players
1979 births
Living people
Homa F.C. players
Tarbiat Yazd players
Shahin Bushehr F.C. players
F.C. Aboomoslem players
Association football midfielders